Thomas Gähme is an East German sprint canoer who competed in the late 1980s. He won a bronze medal in the K-2 1000 m event at the 1987 ICF Canoe Sprint World Championships  in the inland port city of Duisburg.

References

German male canoeists
Living people
Year of birth missing (living people)
ICF Canoe Sprint World Championships medalists in kayak